General Sir Roger Hale Sheaffe, 1st Baronet (15 July 1763 – 17 July 1851) was a Loyalist General in the British Army during the War of 1812. He was created a Baronet in 1813 and afterwards served as Commander and acting Lieutenant Governor of Upper Canada. There is conflicting information to statements regarding his military accomplishments (1812) in the "Letters of Veritas" in and around page 50.

Early life
Roger Hale Sheaffe was born at Boston, Massachusetts, the third son and eighth child of Susannah Child (1730–1811), daughter of Susannah Hatch and Thomas Child and William Sheaffe (1705–1771), a graduate of Harvard University who became Deputy Collector of Customs at Boston. Her father was an Englishman of the same family as Richard Child, 1st Earl Tylney. He owned considerable property in his native Lincolnshire but emigrated to Boston where he co-founded Trinity Church, in 1733.

One of Sheafe's sisters, Margaret, married Robert Livingston, of Clermont Manor, one of the Founding Fathers of the United States. Another sister, Susanna, married Captain Ponsonby Molesworth, grandson of Robert Molesworth, 1st Viscount Molesworth. A third sister married Benjamin Clarke Cutler, brother of Mrs Samuel Ward.

Sheaffe was educated at the Boston Latin School with his cousin Sir Isaac Coffin, 1st Baronet. His father died penniless in 1771 and his mother opened a boarding house to support her 10 children. One of the residents there was Lord Percy, later the 2nd Duke of Northumberland, the leader of the British forces in Boston during the American War of Independence. Lord Percy greatly aided the family during the War and was so struck by the qualities and the leadership potential of Sheaffe that he sent him to a military academy in London. Lord Percy became Sheaffe's lifelong friend and benefactor, purchasing his first commission as Ensign in 1778 in the 5th Regiment of Foot. He later purchased a lieutenancy.

Military career

Sheaffe served with his regiment in Ireland from 1781 until 1787, when it was posted to Canada. In Detroit and at Fort Niagara, he served under Lieutenant Governor John Graves Simcoe, who had a high opinion of him. He was commissioned Captain in 1795. He first served under Lieutenant-Colonel Isaac Brock in the 49th Regiment of Foot in 1798; they served together in the campaign against the Batavian Republic in 1799 and in the Baltic in 1801.

The 49th was posted to Canada in 1802. As Lieutenant-Colonel, Sheaffe commanded the garrison at Fort George, where he faced an attempted mutiny. Despite his own notable achievements, Sheaffe was often compared unfavourably with the popular and charismatic Brock. Sheaffe had been Brock's second in command prior to their time in Canada, and continued in that role upon their arrival. Shortly after arriving at their new station, a mutiny was attempted by some of Sheaffe's men. Brock hurriedly came to the aid of his subordinate, ended the mutiny without conflict, and arrested the perpetrators. They claimed they took their actions directly as a result of Sheaffe's belligerence, but were subsequently executed after a court-martial.  Brock warned Sheaffe to stop working the men too hard and to stop punishing men harshly for small infractions.

Sheaffe nevertheless attained the rank of Colonel in 1808, and Major-General in 1811. This last promotion actually hurt Sheaffe financially, as he transferred from a full-pay commission as Colonel of the 49th to half pay as an unassigned general officer on the staff.

War of 1812

Sheaffe returned to Canada from a visit to England in July 1812. The next month, the War of 1812 broke out. Sir George Prevost, the Governor General of Canada and commander in chief of the forces there, appointed Sheaffe to command the troops at Fort George on the Niagara River. While Brock was absent, dealing with an American army at the Siege of Detroit, Sheaffe was required by Prevost to negotiate an armistice with the American forces on the opposite side of the river. Prevost may have believed that peace could be negotiated quickly, but by the time the armistice ended, the Americans had been substantially reinforced.

Early on 13 October the Americans began crossing the Niagara at Queenston, a few miles south of Fort George. Brock galloped from Fort George to Queenston, arriving just in time to see the Americans capture the commanding heights and a British heavy gun battery. He sent orders to Sheaffe to bring reinforcements, but before they could arrive he led two frontal assaults against the heights. During the second, he was shot dead. Sheaffe arrived on the battlefield at 2pm. In contrast to Brock's actions, he waited for reinforcements before leading his force on a wide detour to the top of the heights, so as to shield them from American artillery. He then meticulously drew up his force before attacking at 4pm. The Americans, terrified of the Mohawks who had also joined the battle, tried to flee but were trapped against the river, and surrendered. One thousand prisoners were taken, for a cost of 50 casualties.

Sheaffe was appointed Lieutenant Governor and commander in Upper Canada in succession to Brock, but was unpopular with the people he was to defend, and often with his own soldiers. During the later months of 1812 he was unable to transact business with the Legislature due to illness and other military commitments, forcing Prevost to make a personal visit to Upper Canada in February 1813.

In April, Sheaffe was present in York, the provincial capital, to deal with the civil authorities. York was weakly defended and Sheaffe had only four companies of regulars, passing through en route to Fort George and other posts. On 27 April, an American force supported by gunboats and other armed vessels attacked. In the Battle of York, Sheaffe's outnumbered troops were driven back to the edge of the town. Sheaffe decided to preserve his regulars and ordered a retreat to Kingston, having destroyed the fort and a sloop of war under construction in the dockyard. The militia were left to be taken prisoner, while the town was looted by the Americans and several buildings were set on fire.

Many prominent citizens of Upper Canada denounced Sheaffe's conduct at York, and Sir George Prevost relieved Sheaffe of his military and civil appointments in Upper Canada, putting him in charge of the troops in Montreal.

Subsequent career

Later in the year, Sheaffe was recalled to Britain. Here he subsequently had a successful military career, being promoted to Lieutenant-General in 1821 and full General in 1835.

He and his family lived in Penzance and Worcester, and when he retired he moved to Edinburgh. In the 1830s he is listed as living at 12 Inverleith Row in north Edinburgh.

He died at his home in 36 Melville Street on 17 July 1851, and is buried in New Calton Cemetery, beside his daughters Frances Julia and Agnes Emily.

He had been awarded a baronetcy in January 1813 as a reward for the victory at Queenston Heights, but as none of his children survived him, the title died with him but his coat of arms was also bestowed on his dead brother's children in perpetuity.

Family
In 1810, at Quebec City, Sheaffe married Margaret, daughter of Isabella Child and John Coffin (1729–1810), a relation of his mother's from Boston. Lady Sheaffe's sister was the mother of Mrs Benjamin Joseph Frobisher, half-sister of Mrs George Hamilton. They had six children, all of whom predeceased their parents:
 
Frances Julia Sheaffe, b. 1812 in Canada, d. 1834 in Edinburgh (buried beside him).
Agnes Isabella Sheaffe, b. 1814 in London, died in infancy.
Agnes Emily Sheaffe, b. 1817 in Worcester, d. 1832 in Edinburgh (buried beside him).
Percy Sheaffe, died as a young man.
Another son and daughter both died in infancy.
 
His younger brother, William, and his wife Mary, died leaving 4 young children. Roger adopted them as his own and brought them up. The boys joined the army and William arrived in Australia as a lieutenant on a convict ship in 1834 with his wife and baby. Their 2 elder children were left in England to be cared for by Roger and Margaret. All the Australian Sheaffes are descended from William and Rosalie.

Dates of rank
Ensign - 1 May 1778
Lieutenant - 27 December 1780
Captain - 6 May 1795
Major - 13 December 1797
Lieutenant Colonel - 22 March 1798
Colonel - 25 April 1808
Major General - 4 June 1811
Lieutenant General - 19 July 1821
General - 28 June 1838

References

External links 
Biography at the Dictionary of Canadian Biography Online
Early Canada Historical Narratives: Sheaffe & Queenston Heights

|-

|-

1763 births
1851 deaths
British Army generals
Lieutenant-Governors of Upper Canada
Politicians from Boston
British Army personnel of the French Revolutionary Wars
British Army personnel of the War of 1812
Baronets in the Baronetage of the United Kingdom
United Empire Loyalists
Royal Northumberland Fusiliers officers
Boston Latin School alumni
British people of the War of 1812
British military personnel of the War of 1812